WRDJ-LP (93.5 FM) is a radio station broadcasting a religious radio format.  The station also broadcasts local news, weather, surf reports and information during NASA events such as launches.  Licensed to Merritt Island, Florida, United States, the station serves the Melbourne, Florida, area.  The station is currently owned by Calvary Chapel of Merritt Island, Inc.

References

External links
 

RDJ-LP
RDJ-LP
Calvary Chapel Association
Merritt Island, Florida